Crosshaven GAA is a Gaelic Athletic Association club based in Crosshaven, County Cork, Ireland.  The club fields Gaelic Football and hurling teams in competitions organized by Carrigdhoun division of Cork GAA.

History
Crosshaven GAA Club was founded in 1884 and is based in Camden.

Achievements
 Cork Junior Football Championship Runners-Up 1964
 Carrigdhoun Junior Football Championship Winners (9) 1929, 1941, 1942, 1952, 1962, 1963, 1964, 1966, 1998    Runners-Up 1930, 1931, 1935, 1955, 1956, 1959, 1961
 Carrigdhoun Junior Hurling Championship Winners (1) 1969  Runners-Up 1966, 1967 (Lost on objection after winning the game)
 South-East Under 21 "A" Football Championship Winners (1) 1975
 South-East Under 21 "C" Football Championship Winners (1) 2019

Notable players
 Brian Murphy - played with Cork Senior Footballers 1967-1970
 Tom Bermingham

External links
  Crosshaven GAA Website

Gaelic games clubs in County Cork
Gaelic football clubs in County Cork
Hurling clubs in County Cork
1884 establishments in Ireland
Gaelic Athletic Association clubs established in 1884